William Bradford (1590–1657) was the governor of Plymouth Colony (now part of Massachusetts) for most of his life.  Descendants of William Bradford, some of whom are listed here, have achieved noteworthy standing in numerous fields.

Descendants

Serena Armstrong-Jones, Countess of Snowdon, wife of David Armstrong-Jones, 2nd Earl of Snowdon
Mabel Keyes Babcock, American landscape architect
The Baldwin brothers: Alec, Daniel, William, and Stephen, American actors
Ambrose Bierce, American dystopian novelist and satirist
Gamaliel Bradford (1863-1932), American biographer and journalist
Robert F. Bradford, American lawyer, Republican Party strategist, and Governor of Massachusetts from 1947 to 1949
William Bradford (1624-1703), son of Governor William Bradford of the Mayflower and military commander of the Plymouth forces during King Philip's War 
William Bradford (1729-1808), American physician, lawyer, and U.S. Senator from Rhode Island
William Bradford (painter), American painter, photographer, and explorer
James G. Carter, American congregational minister, Massachusetts State Representative, and pioneer of Normal schools and public education
Julia Child, American entrepreneur and chef of French and French-influenced cuisine
Frederic Edwin Church, American landscape painter
Charles W. Comstock, United States Attorney for the District of Connecticut and former Connecticut judge
The Dimmicks (SE was a first cousin of brothers MM and WH, and father of JB.  SE was also the father-in-law to eventual second wife of Benjamin Harrison.)
J. Benjamin Dimmick (1858–1920), Mayor of Scranton, Pennsylvania
Milo Melankthon Dimmick (1811–1872), U.S. Representative from Pennsylvania, 1849–1853, candidate for president; Judge in Pennsylvania 1853
Samuel E. Dimmick (1822–1875), Pennsylvania Attorney General (1873–1875).
William Harrison Dimmick (1815–1861), Prosecuting Attorney of Wayne County, Pennsylvania, 1836–1837; Pennsylvania State Senator, 1845–1847; U.S. Representative from Pennsylvania, 1857–1861
Frank Nelson Doubleday, American publisher, and his descendants, including Nelson Doubleday, Nelson Doubleday, Jr., and Russell Doubleday
George Eastman, American inventor and the founder of the Eastman Kodak Company
Clint Eastwood, American film actor, director, and producer
Harold Eugene Edgerton,  professor at MIT; developer of pioneering stop-action photographic techniques and electronic flashes
Catherine Drew Gilpin Faust, (born September 18, 1947), is an American historian, college administrator, and the president of Harvard University.
Sally Field (born November 6, 1946) is an American actress, singer, producer, director, and screenwriter.
Charles Dana Gibson, Life magazine publisher and illustrator, best known for his "Gibson Girl" drawings
Hugh Hefner, Playboy founder
Daniel Gibson Knowlton, classicist bookbinder at Brown University
Edward "Ned" Lamont, American businessman and politician, 89th Governor of Connecticut
John Lithgow, American actor and philanthropist
Jan Masaryk, Czechoslovak diplomat and politician
George B. McClellan, Civil War general, Governor of New Jersey, Democratic opponent of Abraham Lincoln in the 1864 United States presidential election
Michaela Paetsch (1961-2023), American violinist and the first American female to have recorded all 24 Paganini Caprices for solo violin.
Thomas Pynchon, American short story writer and novelist
Christopher Reeve, American film actor and political activist
William Rehnquist, Associate Justice of the United States Supreme Court from 1972 to 1986 and Chief Justice of the United States from 1986 until his death in 2005
Deborah Sampson, female member of the Continental Army in the American Revolutionary War
Benjamin Spock, child care specialist and author
Adlai Stevenson III, United States Democratic Senator representing Illinois from 1970 to 1981, two-time candidate for Governor of Illinois
Arthur Ochs Sulzberger, Jr., publisher of The New York Times since 1992
Charles Sumner, American statesman and Republican Party politician
Telford Taylor, Second Chief Prosecutor at the Nuremberg Trials
Dick Thornburgh, former Pennsylvania governor and US Attorney General
Noah Webster, American educator, journalist, and lexicographer noted for the Webster's Dictionary
William Collins Whitney, American financier and politician, and his descendants, the Whitney family
Lyman Spitzer Jr., American theoretical physicist, astronomer and mountaineer. Namesake of NASA's Spitzer Space Telescope.
Ariovistus Pardee, American engineer, coal baron, philanthropist, and director of the Lehigh Valley Railroad. Founder of Hazeltown, Pennsylvania.
Ario Pardee Jr., officer in the Union Army during the American Civil War, son of Ariovistus Pardee.
Calvin Pardee, businessman from Pennsylvania, son of Ariovistus Pardee.
Harold E. B. Pardee, American cardiologist

See also
William Bradford

Notes

People from Plymouth, Massachusetts
Bradford, William